Veronica Rossi (born 16 June 1973) is a Brazilian-American novelist known for her debut New York Times-bestselling book trilogy Under the Never Sky. Film rights to the trilogy have been optioned by Warner Brothers Studios, with the novel being sold in more than 25 international markets.

Biography 
Rossi moved often in her childhood and lived in Mexico and Venezuela.
Before Rossi wrote her first book, she completed undergraduate studies at the University of California, Los Angeles and went on to study fine art at the California College of the Arts in San Francisco. Her new novel Riders is expected for a release in 2016.  She also co-authors new adult novels under the pen name Noelle August with writer and editor, Lorin Oberweger.

Rossi currently lives in Northern California with her husband and two sons. When not writing, she enjoys reading, painting, and counting down the minutes until she can get back to making up stories about imaginary people.

Bibliography

Under the Never Sky trilogy 
 Under the Never Sky (2012) 
 Through the Ever Night (2013) 
 Into the Still Blue (2014)

Riders series 
 Riders (2016)
 Seeker (2017)

Standalones
 Rebel Spy (2020)

References

External links

  Author's blog
 
 

1973 births
Living people
American science fiction writers
American young adult novelists
American women novelists
Women writers of young adult literature
Women science fiction and fantasy writers
Writers of young adult science fiction
21st-century American women